The 1964 Tour de France was the 51st edition of the Tour de France, one of cycling's Grand Tours. Stages 3, 10 and 22 were all two-part stages with the first half being a regular stage and the second half being a team or individual time trial. It was the only Tour de France to include a mid-stage climb to the Alpe d'Huez ski resort. The race was eventually won by Jacques Anquetil following an epic shoulder-to-shoulder battle with Raymond Poulidor during stage 20.

Teams

The 1964 Tour started with 132 cyclists, divided into 12 teams of 11 cyclists.

The teams entering the race were:

Pre-race favourites

The main favourite was defending champion Jacques Anquetil. He had won the 1964 Giro d'Italia earlier that year, and was trying to win a Tour-Giro double, which at that moment had only been done by Fausto Coppi.

Route and stages

The 1964 Tour de France started on 22 June, and had one rest day in Andorra.

Race overview

Anquetil, who was looking for his fifth Tour victory, was superior in the time trials, of which he won all three. But Raymond Poulidor dominated in the mountains, and Anquetil was close to losing.

The ninth stage finished in Monaco, where the riders would ride one extra lap, crossing the finish line twice. When the first group, including Poulidor and Anquetil, reached the finish line for the first time, Poulidor had forgotten the extra lap, and sprinted in avail for the victory. When the group reached the finish line for the second time, Anquetil won the sprint, and one minute of bonification time.

In the second part of the tenth stage, the time trial, Anquetil won. Poulidor finished in second place, losing 36 seconds, with a flat tire costing him some time.

In the rest day between the thirteenth and the fourteenth stage, Anquetil had joined a lamb barbecue, and in the fourteenth stage he was immediately dropped. His team director gave him a bottle of champagne, which washed away the indigestion, and then Anquetil was able to get back to Poulidor. Poulidor then broke a spoke, the repair cost him some time, even more because a team mechanic, trying to help him gain speed, made him fall.

Poulidor attacked in the fifteenth stage, and stayed away. He won the stage, and in the general classification climbed to third place, nine seconds behind second-placed Anquetil.

Anquetil won the time trial of stage 17, and became the leader; Poulidor was in second place, only 56 seconds behind. In the twentieth stage, Poulidor did not have the right bicycle for the climb, but did not tell it to his team director. Poulidor dropped Anquetil in the climb, but the margin was not big enough for him to take over the lead, and Anquetil remained leader of the race by 14 seconds.

In the final time trial, Anquetil was the favourite, being the specialist. Poulidor rode as fast as he could, and with all other cyclists but Anquetil finished, had the best time. Anquetil was the last rider to ride the time trial, and was five seconds slower at the intermediate time check, which gave Poulidor hope that he could emerge as winner. However, Anquetil was clearly faster in the second part, and won the time trial. Anquetil won the Tour by only 55 seconds, which was at that moment the smallest margin in history.

Classification leadership and minor prizes

There were several classifications in the 1964 Tour de France, two of them awarding jerseys to their leaders. The most important was the general classification, calculated by adding each cyclist's finishing times on each stage. The cyclist with the least accumulated time was the race leader, identified by the yellow jersey; the winner of this classification is considered the winner of the Tour.

Additionally, there was a points classification. In the points classification, cyclists got points for finishing among the best in a stage finish. The cyclist with the most points lead the classification, and was identified with a green jersey.

There was also a mountains classification. The organisation had categorised some climbs as either first, second, third, or fourth-category; points for this classification were won by the first cyclists that reached the top of these climbs first, with more points available for the higher-categorised climbs. The cyclist with the most points lead the classification, but was not identified with a jersey.

For the team classification, the times of the best three cyclists per team on each stage were added; the leading team was the team with the lowest total time. The riders in the team that led this classification wore yellow caps.

In addition, there was a combativity award, in which a jury composed of journalists gave points after certain stages to the cyclist they considered most combative. The split stages each had a combined winner. At the conclusion of the Tour, Henry Anglade won the overall super-combativity award, also decided by journalists. The Souvenir Henri Desgrange was given in honour of Tour founder Henri Desgrange to the first rider to pass a point by his final residence, the "Villa Mia" in Beauvallon, Grimaud, on the French Riviera on stage 10a. This prize was won by André Darrigade.

Final standings

General classification

Points classification

Mountains classification

Team classification

Notes

References

Bibliography

External links

 
1964
1964 in French sport
1964 in road cycling
June 1964 sports events in Europe
July 1964 sports events in Europe
1964 Super Prestige Pernod